Glenn Davis may refer to:

Sportsmen
Glenn Davis (baseball) (born 1961), American baseball player
Glenn Davis (halfback) (1924–2005), known as "Mr. Outside", American football player
Glenn Davis (athlete) (1934–2009), known as "Jeep", Olympic runner and NFL wide receiver
Glenn Davis (sportscaster), American sports journalist, soccer player and coach
Glenn Davis (1990s baseball player)
Glynn Davis (born 1991), American baseball player

Politicians
Glenn Davis (Arizona politician), Arizona House of Representatives
Glenn Davis (politician), American politician from Virginia
Glenn Robert Davis (1914–1988), U.S. congressman from Wisconsin

Others
Glenn Davis (American actor), American actor
Glenn Davis (web design), web designer
Glenn Davis (producer) on Once a Thief (TV series)

See also
Glen Davis (disambiguation)
Glen Davies (disambiguation)